The Ozone was a ship built in 1886 near Glasgow, in Scotland. It could exceed 17 kts and is regarded as one of the finest paddle steamers ever built.

Ozone was commissioned by the Bay Excursion Company and relocated to Australia, where it became a great favorite on Port Phillip Bay, in Victoria, and remained in service there for many years.

History

The Ozone's first bay excursion was on 18 December 1886, when she commenced a run between Melbourne and Queenscliff. On arrival she collided with the pier at Queenscliff.

In 1889, the Ozone was involved in a collision with the vessel Elfin, in Hobsons Bay, near Williamstown.

In 1894, she was involved in another collision, this time with the vessel May, in Port Phillip Bay.

The Ozone was withdrawn from service in 1918 and was sold to Melbourne shipbreaker J. Hill in March 1925. In October 1925 she was dismantled and her hull was sunk off-shore at Indented Head to form a breakwater for small craft.

The wreck is gradually eroding away. In April 1991, the starboard paddle wheel collapsed, dramatically changing the configuration of the remains. One of Ozone's two anchors has been incorporated into an historical monument, which stands on the cliff-top near Taylor Reserve, Indented Head, overlooking the wreck.

Dive location

The wreckage of the Ozone remains visible about 50 metres offshore at Indented Head. The wreck is an easy shallow dive.

References

Further reading
Ozone 1886–1925
Port Phillip Shipwrecks

External links
 

Water transport in Australia
Paddle steamers
Ships built on the River Clyde
Port Phillip
Underwater diving sites in Australia